The Polish Indoor Athletics Championships is an annual indoor track and field competition organised by the Polish Athletic Association, which serves as the national championship for the sport in Poland. Typically held over two to three days in February during the Dutch winter, it was first added to the national calendar in 1933, supplementing the main outdoor Polish Athletics Championships held in the summer since 1920. The national indoor competition was held from 1933–56 (with a break during World War II from 1939 to 1945). After a near twenty-year gap, the championships was restored to its annual fixture in 1973.

Events
The following athletics events feature as standard on the Polish Indoor Championships programme:

 Sprint: 60 m, 200 m, 400 m
 Distance track events: 800 m, 1500 m, 3000 m
 Hurdles: 60 m hurdles
 Jumps: long jump, triple jump, high jump, pole vault
 Throws: shot put
 Combined events: heptathlon (men), pentathlon (women)
 Racewalking: 5000 m walk (men), 3000 m walk (women)

The 200 metres was introduced in 1982. Combined events were added in 1974 – for men this was first held as a sextathlon, then as a heptathlon thereafter. The heptathlon was replaced by an octathlon between 1987–89. A men's walk race over 10,000 m was held from 1981–86, before being reduced to the standard 5000 m distance. Similarly, women competed in the 5000 m walk from 1983–86 until being replaced by the standard 3000 m distance. The women's 3000 metres run became an annual fixture in 2000. The addition of women's triple jump (1991) and pole vault (1998) brought parity in the number of events for the sexes.

Editions

Championships records

Men

Women

References

Editions
Lekkoatleta nr 2 (69), March 2004, p. 25

External links
Polish Athletics Federation official website

 
Athletics competitions in Poland
National indoor athletics competitions
Recurring sporting events established in 1933
1933 establishments in Poland
February sporting events